David Nualart (born 21 March 1951) is a Spanish mathematician working in the field of probability theory, in particular on aspects of stochastic processes and stochastic analysis.

He obtained his PhD titled "Contribución al estudio de la integral estocástica" in 1975 at the University of Barcelona under the supervision of Francesc d'Assís Sales Vallès.
After positions at the University of Barcelona and the Polytechnique University of Barcelona he took up a professorship at the University of Kansas and is currently the Black-Babcock Distinguished Professor in its Mathematics Department.

He published hundreds of scientific articles in his field, served on several scientific committees, has been an associate editor of many journals and from 2006 to 2008 was the Chief Editor of Electronic Communications in Probability.

Recognition
He has been elected a Fellow of the Institute of Mathematical Statistics in 1997.
He received a Doctor Honoris Causa by the Université Blaise Pascal of Clermond-Ferrand in 1998.
He received the Prize IBERDROLA de Ciencia y Tecnologia in 1999.
He has been a Corresponding Member of the Real Academia de Ciencias Exactas Fisicas y Naturales of
Madrid since 2003.
He has been a member of the Reial Academia de Ciencies i Arts of Barcelona since 2003.
He received the Research Prize of the Real Academia de Ciencias de Madrid in 1991.

In March 2011 the International Conference on Malliavin Calculus and Stochastic Analysis in honor of David
Nualart took place at University of Kansas.

He as named to the 2023 class of Fellows of the American Mathematical Society, "for contributions to Malliavin calculus, stochastic PDE's, and fractional Brownian motion".

References

https://web.archive.org/web/20120331065622/http://www.math.ku.edu/~nualart/cv.pdf

External links
https://web.archive.org/web/20120331065603/http://www.math.ku.edu/~nualart/ - Webpage of David Nualart at Kansas University

1951 births
Living people
20th-century Spanish mathematicians
Mathematical analysts
University of Barcelona alumni
21st-century Spanish mathematicians
Fellows of the American Mathematical Society